John Gustafson may refer to:

John Gustafson (musician) (1942–2014), bassist and vocalist
John Gustafson (scientist) (born 1955), computer scientist and inventor of Gustafson's law